Abdullayev is a masculine surname, found in Azerbaijan, Russia, and Central Asia. The feminine surname counterpart is Abdullayeva. It is slavicized from Abdullah. The name Abdullayev is used by the following people:
Abdusalom Abdullayev (born 1951), Tajikistani artist and cinematographer
Aghakhan Abdullayev (born 1950), Azerbaijani folk singer
Alasgar Abdullayev, birth name of Shakili Alasgar (1866–1929), Azerbaijani folk musician
Araz Abdullayev (born 1992), Azerbaijani association football player
Asgar Abdullayev (footballer) (born 1960), retired Azerbaijani association football player
Chingiz Abdullayev (born 1959), Azerbaijani writer
Elshad Abdullayev (born 1961), Azerbaijani lawyer and university official
Kamal Mehdi Abdullayev (born 1950), Azerbaijani philologist and university official
Lutfali Abdullayev (1914–1973), Azerbaijani actor
Mikayil Abdullayev (1921–2002), Azerbaijani painter
Namiq Abdullayev (born 1972), Azerbaijani wrestler
Pulat Abdullayev (born 1942), Russian diplomat
Rashad Abdullayev (born 1981), Azerbaijani association football player
Rovnag Abdullayev (born 1965), Azerbaijani businessman and politician
Supyan Abdullayev (born 1956), Chechen politician

See also
Abdullaev
Abdulayev
 Abdulov
 Abdulin
 Abdullin
 Abdulov

References

Notes

Sources
И. М. Ганжина (I. M. Ganzhina). "Словарь современных русских фамилий" (Dictionary of Modern Russian Last Names). Москва, 2001. 

Surnames of Uzbekistani origin
Azerbaijani-language surnames
Kazakh-language surnames
Kyrgyz-language surnames
Russian-language surnames
Tajik-language surnames
Turkmen-language surnames
Uzbek-language surnames
Patronymic surnames
Surnames from given names
